The Southeastern Pennsylvania Transportation Authority contains two major rapid transit lines; The Market–Frankford Line and the Broad Street Line, both of which were inherited from the former Philadelphia Transportation Company, and originally built by the Philadelphia Rapid Transit Company. Both lines are officially part of the City Transit Division. It also includes the Norristown High Speed Line (Route 100) an interurban commuter rail line between Norristown, Pennsylvania and Upper Darby, Pennsylvania, originally owned by the Philadelphia and Western Railroad, then acquired by the Philadelphia Suburban Transportation Company, which itself  was originally the Philadelphia and West Chester Traction Company.

Market-Frankford Line stations
NOTE: All stations are located in the City of Philadelphia, unless stated otherwise.

Existing stations

Former stations

Broad Street Line stations
NOTE: All existing stations are located in the City of Philadelphia. All former stations are located in the City of Philadelphia, unless stated otherwise.

Existing stations

Former stations

Norristown High Speed Line stations

References

External links
Map of Philadelphia Transit Systems (UrbanRail.net)
Market-Frankford El (Workshops of the World)
Philadelphia Transit Vehicles: Market-Frankford and Broad Street Lines

 
 
 
Lists of metro stations
Lists of Pennsylvania railway stations